The 2020 Big Ten conference football season is the 125th season of college football play for the Big Ten Conference and part of the 2020 NCAA Division I FBS football season. This was the Big Ten's seventh season with 14 teams. The defending league champion was Ohio State.

Due to the COVID-19 pandemic in the United States, the conference voted on August 11, 2020, to indefinitely postpone all fall athletics, including football, citing the worsening trends of the pandemic in the country. On September 16, the conference approved a shortened, eight-game football season beginning October 24, with the final week featuring the Big Ten championship game on December 19.

The Big Ten had two new coaches for the 2020 season. Rutgers hired former coach Greg Schiano to serve as head coach, replacing Chris Ash who was fired during the 2019 season. Michigan State head coach Mark Dantonio announced on February 4, 2020, that he was retiring from his position. The Spartans announced the hiring of Mel Tucker as the new head coach on February 12, 2020. On December 13, Illinois fired its head coach Lovie Smith, and on December 19 announced the hiring of Bret Bielema as its new head coach.

Previous season
On the field of play last season, Ohio State won the East Division title and made their fifth appearance in the Big Ten Championship Game and third consecutive appearance. In the West Division, Wisconsin and Minnesota tied for the division title, but the Badgers represented the division in the conference title game due to their head-to-head win over the Golden Gophers. Wisconsin made their sixth appearance in the conference title game overall. In that championship game, Ohio State defeated Wisconsin 34–21 to win their third consecutive Big Ten championship. With that win, the Buckeyes landed a spot in the 2019–20 College Football Playoff as the #2 seed.

Nine teams participated in bowl games in the 2018 season, and the league went 5–4 in those games. Ohio State made the College Football Playoff but fell to Clemson 29–23 in the Fiesta Bowl.

Delay of season 
On July 9, 2020, due to the COVID-19 pandemic in the United States, the Big Ten announced that all competition in fall sports, including football, would be played exclusively in-conference, in order to "have the greatest flexibility to adjust its own operations throughout the season and make quick decisions in real-time". An updated 10-game conference-only schedule was released on August 5, 2020.

On August 11, in the wake of multiple Group of Five conferences deciding to do so, the council of the Big Ten voted 11–3 to postpone fall athletics for the 2020–21 season (with all but Iowa, Nebraska, and Ohio State voting in favor). Commissioner Kevin Warren cited negative trends and uncertainties surrounding COVID-19 as a factor in the decision. The conference stated that it would evaluate options, including possibly playing in spring 2021 instead. After the decision to postpone the season, the Big Ten formed a taskforce to investigate options for a return to play. President Donald Trump criticized the Big Ten's decision to postpone fall football, as part of his general criticism of U.S. colleges and universities that have not resumed on-campus activities. All other Power Five conferences besides the Pac-12 (which also postponed its season shortly after the Big Ten's decision) were still planning to play in the fall.

On September 14, it was reported that the Big Ten was considering the possibility of reversing its decision and playing a shortened conference football season as early as mid-to-late October. On September 16, the Big Ten approved an eight-game conference season that would begin October 24, and conclude on December 19 with the Big Ten Championship Game. The conference originally planned to hold a slate of cross-division matchups between seeds alongside the championship game.

The conference instituted a daily antigen testing protocol from September 30; PCR tests are used to confirm positives found via antigen testing. Players who test positive on both tests are removed from play for at least 21 days and undergo cardiac tests during this period, and will have to be cleared by a cardiologist before they can return to play. Positivity rates among participating teams and the local population will also be a factor: teams with a positivity rate above 5% or a population positivity rate above 7% will be required to halt all activity for seven days.

Preseason

2020 Big Ten Spring Football and number of signees on signing day:

Recruiting classes

Big Ten Media Days

Preseason media polls
Below are the results of the media poll with total points received next to each school and first-place votes in parentheses. For the 2020 poll, Ohio State was voted as the favorite to win both the East Division and the Big Ten Championship Game. This is the 10th iteration of the preseason media poll conducted by Cleveland.com, which polls at least one credentialed media member for each Big Ten team. Only twice in the last ten years has the media accurately predicted the Big Ten champion.

Preseason awards

Preseason All-Big Ten

Rankings

The AP and Coaches Polls ranked Big Ten teams in the preseason, but then removed those teams after the league suspended play.

The Coaches Poll returned to ranking Big Ten teams with the Sept. 20 poll. The AP Poll returned Big Ten teams to the rankings with the Sept. 27 poll.

Schedule

All times Eastern time.

† denotes Homecoming game

Regular season schedule
The Regular season was scheduled to begin on September 3 and end on November 28. The Big Ten Championship Game was scheduled to be held on December 5, 2020.

On July 9, 2020, the Big Ten Conference announced that all non-conference contests in all fall sports, including football, would be canceled due to the COVID-19 pandemic. The league then moved to institute a 10-game, conference-only schedule in football, which would include multiple open weeks for teams in order to introduce flexibility into the schedule. On August 5, the Big Ten released the new reconfigured 10-game conference-only schedule. On August 11, 2020, the conference decided to postpone all fall sports and evaluate option to restart competition in spring 2021.

On September 16, 2020, the Big Ten announced that the football season would start on the weekend of October 24. There will be an eight-game regular season taking place over eight weeks.  Each team will play all the other teams in its division, plus two crossover games with teams in the other division.  Then the league championship game will be played on December 19.  Also on the weekend of December 19, there will be crossover divisional games featuring the 2nd place teams from each division facing off, the 3rd places teams meeting each other, etc. The new schedule was released on September 19.

On December 9, the Big Ten waived its rule of requiring teams to play a minimum of six league games to be eligible for the Big Ten Championship Game, allowing Ohio State (5-0) to represent the East Division.

Week #1

Week #2 

The Wisconsin at Nebraska game was canceled due to a COVID-19 outbreak at Wisconsin

Week #3 

The Purdue at Wisconsin game was canceled due to a COVID-19 outbreak at Wisconsin

Week #4 

The Ohio State at Maryland game was canceled due to a COVID-19 outbreak at Maryland.

Week #5 

Michigan State at Maryland was canceled due to COVID-19 cases at Maryland.

Week #6 

Ohio State at Illinois was canceled after positive COVID-19 at Ohio State.

Minnesota at Wisconsin was canceled after positive COVID-19 tests at Minnesota.

Week #7 

 

Northwestern at Minnesota was canceled after COVID issues at Minnesota.

Maryland at Michigan was canceled after COVID issues at Michigan.

Week #8 

Michigan at Ohio State game was canceled after COVID-19 issues at Michigan.

Purdue at Indiana was canceled by mutual agreement after increased COVID-19 issues at both schools.

Week #9: Big Ten Championship Game and Champions Week games 

|-
|colspan="8" style="text-align:center;"|Big Ten Championship Game

|-
|colspan="8" style="text-align:center;"|Champions Week Games
|-

Note: The additional games were originally planned to be cross-divisional matchups of the teams with the same standings – second place vs. second place, third place vs. third place, and so on.  The schedule was changed to preserve rivalry games that were canceled during the regular season, and to avoid rematches.

Indiana-Purdue game canceled due to COVID-19 issues at both schools.

Nebraska's game with Rutgers has been adjusted from a 3:00 PM to a 6:30 PM kickoff time on Friday, December 18 after the cancellation of the Indiana-Purdue game.

Michigan-Iowa game canceled due to COVID-19 issues at Michigan.

Maryland-Michigan State game canceled due to COVID-19 issues at Maryland.

Canceled regular season games
The following non-conference games were canceled due to the COVID-19 pandemic:

Sept. 3
 Florida Atlantic at Minnesota

Sept. 4
 Illinois State at Illinois

Sept. 5

 Bowling Green at Ohio State
 Kent State at Penn State

 Michigan at Washington
 Monmouth at Rutgers

 Northern Iowa at Iowa

 Towson at Maryland

Sept. 12

 Ball State at Michigan
 Central Michigan at Nebraska
 Connecticut at Illinois
 Iowa State at Iowa

 Memphis at Purdue
 Michigan State at BYU
 Northern Illinois at Maryland
 Ohio State at Oregon

 Penn State at Virginia Tech
 Southern Illinois at Wisconsin
 Syracuse at Rutgers

 Tennessee Tech at Minnesota
 Tulane at Northwestern
 Western Kentucky at Indiana

Sept. 19

 Air Force at Purdue
 Appalachian State at Wisconsin
 Arkansas State at Michigan

 Ball State at Indiana
 Bowling Green at Illinois
 Buffalo at Ohio State

 Central Michigan at Northwestern
 Maryland at West Virginia
 Rutgers at Temple

 San Jose State at Penn State
 South Dakota State at Nebraska
 Toledo at Michigan State

Sept. 26

 BYU at Minnesota
 Cincinnati at Nebraska

 Indiana at Connecticut
 Miami (FL) at Michigan State

 Northern Illinois at Iowa

 Purdue at Boston College

Oct. 3
 Wisconsin vs. Notre Dame (at Green Bay, WI)

Nov. 14
 Morgan State at Northwestern

Postseason

Bowl games
Games below do not include bowl games that Big Ten teams may be selected for in the College Football Playoff semifinals (the Rose Bowl and Sugar Bowl on January 1, 2021) or potential At-Large bids in New Year's Six Bowls (the Cotton Bowl on December 30, 2020, and Peach Bowl on January 1, 2021).

Five Big Ten teams accepted bowl bids for the 2020–21 season, with Ohio State being selected for the College Football Playoff.

Rankings are from CFP rankings.  All times Eastern Time Zone.  Big Ten teams shown in bold.

Big Ten records vs other conferences
2020–2021 records against non-conference foes:

Postseason

Awards and honors

Player of the week honors

Big Ten Individual Awards

The following individuals won the conference's annual player and coach awards:

All-Conference Teams

2020 Big Ten All-Conference Teams and Awards

Coaches Honorable Mention: ILLINOIS: Chase Brown, Mike Epstein, Blake Hayes, Doug Kramer, Vederian Lowe, James McCourt, Roderick Perry II; INDIANA: Harry Crider, Cam Jones, Whop Philyor, Reese Taylor, Haydon Whitehead; IOWA: Dane Belton, Riley Moss, Mekhi Sargent, Ihmir Smith-Marsette, Cody Ince, Kyler Schott, Sam LaPorta; MARYLAND: Chance Campbell, Nick Cross, Jaelyn Duncan, Mo Kite, Tarheeb Still; MICHIGAN: Hassan Haskins, Daxton Hill, Carlo Kemp, Kwity Paye, Brad Robbins, Andrew Stueber; MICHIGAN STATE: Drew Beesley, Matt Coghlin; MINNESOTA: Coney Durr, Boye Mafe, Tanner Morgan, John Michael Schmitz, Conner Olson, Blaise Andries, Sam Schlueter; NEBRASKA: Marquel Dismuke, JoJo Domann, Matt Farniok, Will Honas, Brenden Jaimes, Wan'Dale Robinson, Ben Stille, Deontai Williams; NORTHWESTERN: Derek Adams, Chris Bergin, Earnest Brown IV, Charlie Kuhbander, Eku Leota, John Raine; OHIO STATE: Sevyn Banks, Tuf Borland, Luke Farrell, Marcus Hooker, Josh Proctor, Jeremy Ruckert, Trey Sermon, Tyreke Smith, Marcus Williamson; PENN STATE: Tariq Castro-Fields, Jahan Dotson, PJ Mustipher, Joey Porter Jr., Antonio Shelton, Brandon Smith, Lamont Wade, Rasheed Walker; PURDUE: Jaylan Alexander, Cam Allen, J.D. Dellinger, Payne Durham, Gus Hartwig, Grant Hermanns, Spencer Holstege, Lorenzo Neal, Rondale Moore; RUTGERS: Michael Dwumfour, Christian Izien, Bo Melton, Reggie Sutton, Julius Turner, Mike Tverdov, Brendon White; WISCONSIN: Tyler Beach, Eric Burrell, Leo Chenal, Faion Hicks, Isaiahh Loudermilk, Jack Sanborn, Mason Stokke, Andy Vujnovich.

Media Honorable Mention: ILLINOIS: Mike Epstein, Doug Kramer, Vederian Lowe, James McCourt, Roderick Perry II; INDIANA: Harry Crider, Cam Jones, Whop Philyor, Reese Taylor, Haydon Whitehead; IOWA: Dane Belton, Seth Benson, Shaun Beyer, Matt Hankins, Cody Ince, Mark Kallenberger, Sam LaPorta, Riley Moss, Nick Niemann, Spencer Petras, Mekhi Sargent, Ihmir Smith-Marsette, Kyler Schott; MARYLAND: Chance Campbell, Nick Cross, Dontay Demus, Jaelyn Duncan, Jake Funk, Rakim Jarrett, Johnny Jordan, Mo Kite, Tarheeb Still, Taulia Tagovailoa; MICHIGAN: Michael Barrett, Hassan Haskins, Brad Hawkins, Daxton Hill, Brad Robbins; MICHIGAN STATE: Drew Beesley, Matt Coghlin, Jayden Reed; MINNESOTA: Coney Durr, Boye Mafe, Tanner Morgan, Sam Schlueter, John Michael Schmitz; NEBRASKA: Dicaprio Bootle, Marquel Dismuke, JoJo Domann, Matt Farniok, Will Honas, Brenden Jaimes, Ben Stille, Cam Taylor-Britt, Deontai Williams; NORTHWESTERN: Derek Adams, Chris Bergin, Earnest Brown IV, Ramaud Chiaokhiao-Bowman, Charlie Kuhbander, JR Pace, John Raine; OHIO STATE: Sevyn Banks, Tuf Borland, Baron Browning, Drue Chrisman, Zach Harrison, Haskell Garrett, Marcus Hooker, Harry Miller, Nicholas Petit-Frere, Trey Sermon, Tyreke Smith; PENN STATE: Jaquan Brisker, Tariq Castro-Fields, Jahan Dotson, Will Fries, PJ Mustipher, Antonio Shelton, Brandon Smith; PURDUE: Cam Allen, J.D. Dellinger, Gus Hartwig, Grant Hermanns, Spencer Holstege, George Karlaftis, Greg Long, Lorenzo Neal, Rondale Moore, Brennan Thieneman; RUTGERS: Michael Dwumfour, Tyshon Fogg, Christian Izien, Bo Melton, Raiqwon O'Neil, Julius Turner, Mike Tverdov, Avery Young; WISCONSIN: Eric Burrell, Leo Chenal, Faion Hicks, Caesar Williams.

All-Americans

The 2020 College Football All-America Team is composed of the following College Football All-American first teams chosen by the following selector organizations: Associated Press (AP), Football Writers Association of America (FWAA), American Football Coaches Association (AFCA), Walter Camp Foundation (WCFF), The Sporting News (TSN), Sports Illustrated (SI), USA Today (USAT) ESPN, CBS Sports (CBS), FOX Sports (FOX) College Football News (CFN), Bleacher Report (BR), Scout.com, Phil Steele (PS), SB Nation (SB), Athlon Sports, Pro Football Focus (PFF), The Athletic, and Yahoo! Sports (Yahoo!).

Currently, the NCAA compiles consensus all-America teams in the sports of Division I-FBS football and Division I men's basketball using a point system computed from All-America teams named by coaches associations or media sources.  The system consists of three points for a first-team honor, two points for second-team honor, and one point for third-team honor.  Honorable mention and fourth team or lower recognitions are not accorded any points.  Football consensus teams are compiled by position and the player accumulating the most points at each position is named first team consensus all-American.  Currently, the NCAA recognizes All-Americans selected by the AP, AFCA, FWAA, TSN, and the WCFF to determine Consensus and Unanimous All-Americans. Any player named to the First Team by all five of the NCAA-recognized selectors is deemed a Unanimous All-American.

*Associated Press All-America Team (AP)
*CBS Sports All-America Team (CBS)
*ESPN Sports All-America Team (ESPN)
*The Athletic All-America Team (Athletic)
*USA Today All-America Team (USAT)
*The Sporting News All-America Team (TSN)
*Football Writers Association of America All-America Team (FWAA)
*American Football Coaches Association All-America Team (AFCA)
*Phil Steele All-America Team (PS)
*Walter Camp Football Foundation All-America Team (WCFF)

All–Academic

National award winners

Home attendance

Due to COVID-19, the Big Ten is not allowing fans into stadiums for the 2020 season. Family members and limited staff are permitted. Some schools count and track those numbers and some do not.

2021 NFL Draft

The Big Ten had 44 players selected in the 2021 NFL Draft, the second-most of any conference, trailing only the SEC who had 65.

Draft Notes

Head coaches

Current through January 11, 2021

* Tom Allen was hired to replace Kevin Wilson in December 2016 at Indiana and coached the Hoosiers in their 2016 bowl game, going 0–1.

* Mike Locksley served as interim head coach at Maryland in 2015 and coached for six games, going 1–5.

* Ryan Day served as interim head coach at Ohio State for the first three games of the 2018 season while Urban Meyer served a three-game suspension and went 3–0.

* Greg Schiano served as head coach at Rutgers from 2001 through 2011 then left for the NFL. Following the conclusion of the 2019 season, Schiano returned to Rutgers for his second stint as head coach. The Scarlet Knights competed in the Big East Conference in his previous stay at the school.

* Lovie Smith was relieved of his coaching duties at Illinois on December 13. Offensive coordinator Rod Smith was named interim coach for the final game of the 2020 season.

References

 
Big Ten Conference football season